Miasteczko-Huby  is a village in the administrative district of Gmina Miasteczko Krajeńskie, within Piła County, Greater Poland Voivodeship, in west-central Poland.

References

Miasteczko-Huby